Trevadlock is a hamlet south of Lewannick, Cornwall, United Kingdom. It includes a re-furbished old chapel, old schoolroom and semi-detached cottages.

Place name history
The name Trevadlock has its origins in the Cornish language.

References

External links

Hamlets in Cornwall